This gallery of coats of arms of Brazilian regions shows the coats of the 26 Brazilian States and the Federal District.

Armorial of Brazilian regions

Armorial of Brazilian capitals
This gallery of coats of arms of Brazilian states shows the coats of the 26 Brazilian State capitals and the Federal District.

States

District

See also
Coat of arms of Brazil
List of Brazilian flags

Brazil culture-related lists